was a career bureaucrat and politician. As Foreign Minister of Japan from 1964 to 1966 he played a pivotal role in diplomatic relations between Japan and the Republic of Korea.

Biography

Early career
Shiina was born in Mizusawa, Iwate (now part of Oshu, Iwate) to Hiroshi Gotō, a member of the Iwate Prefectural Assembly and former elementary school teacher. His father later served as mayor of Mizusawa for ten years. The Gotō family claimed descent from the famed rangaku scholar Takano Chōei, whose childhood name was "Saburō Etsu", and thus Shiina was named "Etsusaburō" in his honor. However, his father went bankrupt due to business issues and Shiina was forced to work during the day and attempted to study at night. He departed for Tokyo during his fourth year of high school and suffered from various difficulties until the family's fortune changed due to royalties received on hydroelectric development projects in the Isawa River and due to a connection via marriage with Tokyo governor Gotō Shimpei. Shiina was thus able to enter the Law School of Tokyo Imperial University and he also changed his name from Gotō to Shiina.

Shiina graduating from Tokyo Imperial University in March 1923, entered the Ministry of Agriculture and Commerce, where he was assigned to the Engineering Bureau. After the Ministry of Agriculture and Commerce separated into the Ministry of Agriculture and Forestry and the Ministry of Commerce and Industry in the following year, he joined that latter. In 1925 he was one of the government officials who were dispatched nationwide to instruct and supervise important export goods and to promote the formation of cartels. As a section manager, he worked for the Aichi Prefectural Office in Nagoya for the next four years. During this time, he visited Manchuria and negotiated with the South Manchurian Railway to operate regularly scheduled shipping connecting Nagoya Port and Dalian.  In 1929, he returned to the Industrial Affairs Division of the Ministry of Commerce and Industry. He was sent to Europe in August 1932 to observe the measures and industrial policies of the European countries during the Great Depression and returned home in May 1933.

Career in Manchukuo
At the request of Nobusuke Kishi, Shiina was one of the first officials of the Japanese Ministry of Commerce and Industry to join the new Manchukuo administration. He arrived in 
Shinkyo in October 1933 as Director of the Planning and Coordination Bureau of the Manchukuo Ministry of Industry. Shiina led an industrial survey of Manchukuo for three years. The survey was also conducted in remote areas of the country where marauders were still a problem, and covering agriculture, forestry, underground resources, and hydroelectric power sources. Based on this survey, the number of farmers from Japan who could emigrate to Manchukuo was determined, and the construction of hydroelectric power plants on the Songhua River and Yalu River was planned. The results of this survey were also used for a five-year industrial development plan. In addition, Shiina established the Critical Industry Control Law which aimed for a state-controlled economy centered on a national monopoly system for each industry. In July 1937, Shiina assumed the position of Director of Mining and Industry. However, in 1939, Shiina asked to resign his posts and to return to Japan. Kishi, together with Yoshisuke Aikawa, offered him an executive role in the Manchurian Industrial Development Company, but Shiina refused and returned to Japan in April 1940.

Wartime career
After returning to Japan in April 1939, Shiina joined the Temporary Material Coordination Bureau of the Ministry of Commerce and Industry, where he was charge of controlling and procuring supplies according to national policy based on the National Mobilization Law. He was the director of the department responsible for chemical products. The Ministry of Commerce and Industry set up a mining department, a steel department, a chemical department, a machinery department, a textile department and a fuel department in accordance with the wartime requirements. In June of the same year, Shiina was promoted to General Manager of the General Affairs Bureau, which managed all of these departments. In October of the same year, Kishi returned to the Ministry of Commerce and Industry as undersecretary and with the support of the Japanese military, Shiina was promoted to director of the Ministry of Internal Affairs and Communications.

In July 1940, the second Konoe Cabinet was established. Kozo Hayashi, Minister of Commerce and Industry, strongly opposed the draft plan of the new economic system, which created a conflict with Kishi. Although Kishi was appointed as the deputy secretary at the end of the same year, he came under investigation by the prosecutor's office, under the auspices of the Minister of Interior, Keichiro Hiranuma. Shinichi Kojima, who was recommended by Shiina, was appointed as the Vice Minister of Commerce and Industry, and succeeded Kishi. In October 1941, when the Tojo Hideki Cabinet was established, Kishi returned as Minister of Commerce and Industry with Shiina as the undersecretary under Kishi.

With the start of the Pacific War, Kishi and Shiina promoted a strict war-controlled economic policy in cooperation with the military, which included conversions of textile factories to weapon factories, and the forced consolidation of many small and medium-sized enterprises for munitions production. When the Ministry of Munitions (Japan) was founded in November 1943, Tojo concurrently served as Minister, with Kishi as undersecretary and Shiina as the Director General of Mobilization. In July 1944, the Tojo Cabinet was forced to resign; however, Shiina remained in his post. In April 1945, with the launch of the Kantarō Suzuki Cabinet, Shiina was promoted to Undersecretary of Munitions. On 26 August, the same year, after the surrender of Japan, the Ministry of Munitions was abolished and the Ministry of Commerce and Industry was revived. Shiina arranged was asked to construct a new organization for the post-war economic reconstruction. He retired from position on 12 October of the same year with the resignation of the Hisgashikuni Cabinet.  Shiina was interrogated eight times by the American occupation authorities, but was not arrested.  He was, however, purged from public office in November 1947.

As company president
Shiina was appointed as president of Tohoku Shinko Textile Industry Co., Ltd., headquartered in Morioka in November 1947. The company changed its name to Tohoku Woven Co., Ltd. in March of the following year. Shiina acquired Daito Boshoku's Kanamachi factory in Tokyo and purchased new equipment. However he was unable to secure loans from the Reconstruction Finance Bank due to implementation of an inflation control policies in 1949. Although he struggled to obtain funds from other sources, due to the company's low technical level, it could not meet up with the special demands created due to the Korean War, and in May 1952 declared bankruptcy. Shiina resigned as president in July of the same year, and Tohoku Woven was later absorbed by Kureha Spinning. Immediately after resigning, Shiina had a breakdown and was hospitalized.

Political career
In 1951 Shiina ran for a seat in the lower house during the 1952 Japanese general election; however, he was unable to obtain assistance from Kishi who had suffered a big loss the previous year. He turned to Kishi's younger brother, Eisaku Sato, for official recognition from the Liberal Party, but Sato refused, and introduced him to the party's election measures chief Shigeki Ozawa, the father of Ichirō Ozawa, who also refused to certify Shiina. Despite these setbacks, Shiina ran anyway, but the results were disastrous, and he was later investigated by the police on suspicion of election violations.

At the invitation of Kishi, who had become secretary general of the Democratic Party, Shiina was nominated 1955 Japanese general election as an official candidate of the Japanese Democratic Party. This time, with the full support of Kishi, and with abundant election funds, he managed to secure a seat. Within the second Ichiro Hatoyama cabinet, Shiina became the Vice Chairman of the Democratic Party of Japan's political affairs, and was a member of the Transportation Committee. In November of the same year, the Democratic Party and the Liberal Party joined to form the Liberal Democratic Party (LDP).

In February 1957, the Kishi became Prime Minister and Shiina is appointed as the party's accounting bureau chief, even though he had only won one election. Under Shiina, political contributions from the business world to the LDP expanded fivefold. In 1958 Japanese general election, Shiina was reelected. He was appointed as Chief Cabinet Secretary in the second Kishi administration despite the fact that he had only won election twice. Kishi defended his choice of Shiina stating that he was essential to negotiating the Treaty of Mutual Cooperation and Security Between the United States and Japan.

Shiina won reelection for a third time in the 1960 Japanese general election, and was appointed Minister of International Trade and Industry in the second Hayato Ikeda cabinet. However, he was immediately accused by opposition political parties of massive election violations, both in 1958 and in 1960. His general manager and accountant, Masazo Matsukawa, was placed on the police "most wanted list", and it was later revealed that the haven where he had been hidden is a company-owned house of one of Shiina's business acquaintances, with Shiina's secretaries providing him with financial assistance. Shiina resigned in June 1961, and afterwards Matsukawa finally surrendered to the authorities and was convicted in March 1962. Despite these issues, Shiina was re-elected once again in the 1963 Japanese general election. In the third Ikeda Cabinet, he was appointed as Minister for Foreign Affairs. He remained in this post under the 1st Eisaku Sato Cabinet. During this time, he negotiated the Japan-Korea Basic Treaty which normalized diplomatic relations between Japan and the Republic of Korea. He visited Korea in person in February 1965 and made a public apology "In our two countries' long history, there have been unfortunate times... it is truly regretable and we are deeply remorseful" during the signing of the Treaty on Basic Relations between Japan and the Republic of Korea on 22 June 1965. An agreement was reached on reparations for Japanese colonial rule over Korea, on the legal status of the Zainichi Koreans in Japan and on fisheries, with decisions on more difficult issues, such as the sovereignty issue over the Liancourt Rocks shelved until a later date. The agreement was severely criticized by opposition parties, newspapers and students in both countries, and Shiina survived votes of no confidence by the Japan Communist Party and Japan Socialist Party on his return. In 1966, he visited the Soviet Union as the first Japanese foreign minister to visit after World War II and negotiated a five-year trade agreement and a civil aviation agreement as well.

In December 1966, Shiina was madeLDP general affairs chairman. After serving for less than a year, he was appointed Minister of International Trade and Industry again under the second Sato administration in November 1967. In July 1972 the post of Sato's successor was contested between Kakuei Tanaka and Takeo Fukuda. Shiina led a faction in favor of Tanaka, and Tanaka became president. In August 1973, Shiina was rewarded by becoming Vice President of the LDP.

When Tanaka decided to normalize diplomatic relations between Japan and the People's Republic of China, Shiina was sent as a special envoy to visit Taiwan to explain the situation to President Chiang Kai-shek. Shiina officially expressed the idea that Japan would continue to maintain diplomatic relations with Taiwan. However, this was different from the LDP's policy, and after Shiina returned from Taiwan, Prime Minister Tanaka and Foreign Minister Masayoshi Ōhira met with Chinese Prime Minister Zhou Enlai in Beijing, and it was agreed that Japan would sever relations with Taiwan. In 1974, the relationship between Japan and South Korea deteriorated over the kidnapping of Kim Dae Jung from Japan, and in September, Tanaka requested Shiina to meet with President Park to calm the issue.

Following LDP losses in the 1974 Japanese House of Councillors election and acrimony between Vice Prime Minister Takeo Miki and Finance Minister Takeo Fukuda, Tanaka asked that Shiina head a committee to reform the party and also asked Tanaka to determine his successor through discussions without an open election. In December 1974, Shiina issued a ruling to the major factions of the party that Takeo Miki should succeed Tanaka - a decision that was largely welcomed by the public due to Miki's "clean" image. Shiina continued to serve as Vice President of the LDP under Miki, but soon had falling out over differences in policy over political contributions and the idea of a single-member constituency system. In May 1976, Shiina used the Lockheed Scandal as cover to seek the resignations of Tanaka, Fukuda, Ohira and Miki from politics. Miki refused, and failure of his attempted coup drastically reduced Shiina's political influence. With the inauguration of the Fukuda administration, Shiina announced his retirement.

He died at Keio Hospital, where he was hospitalized on 30 September, at the age of 81 and was buried in the Shunjuen Cemetery in Kawasaki, Kanagawa, Japan.

Honours
Grand Cordon of the Order of the Rising Sun (29 April 1969)

Foreign honour
 : Grand Crosses with Star and Sash of the Order of Merit of the Federal Republic of Germany (1960)
 : Knights Grand Cross of the Order of Isabella the Catholic (23 February 1965)

References

|-

|-

|-

|-

|-

|-

1898 births
1979 deaths
Foreign ministers of Japan
University of Tokyo alumni
People of Manchukuo
People from Iwate Prefecture
Knights Grand Cross of the Order of Isabella the Catholic
Grand Crosses with Star and Sash of the Order of Merit of the Federal Republic of Germany
Politicians from Iwate Prefecture